Iztapasauria (also branded as IztapaSauria) is a free-entry dinosaur theme park in Iztapalapa, Mexico City. It opened on 4 December 2021 inside the Deportivo Utopía Santa Cruz Meyehualco sports center. The theme park has several green areas decorated as a Mezozoic jungle in which there are thirteen animatronic dinosaurs.

History and construction

Experts from UNAM's Institute of Geology contributed to the planning of the park. The complete rehabilitation of the sports center, which included the installation of the theme park, cost 100 million pesos. The rehabilitation and installation was requested by Clara Brugada, the head of the borough's office, and was inaugurated on 4 December 2021. Among the animatronics are species of Triceratops, Tyrannosaurus, Velociraptor, Omeisaurus, Irritator, Carnotaurus and Brontosaurus.

References

External links
 
 
 IztapaSauria at the Secretariat of Culture of Mexico City website (in Spanish)

2021 establishments in Mexico
Amusement parks in Mexico City
Amusement parks opened in 2021
Animal theme parks